El Continental is a Spanish drama television series about organised crime set in 1920s Spain. Created, written and directed by Frank Ariza, it aired from September to November 2018 on La 1. Harshly criticised during its pre-screening at the FesTVal and with dismal ratings during its free-to-air broadcasting run, the series was described as "the biggest fiasco of national (Spanish) fiction in recent times".

Premises 
The series, set in the 1920s Madrid, is titled after a fictional club in which illegal businesses take place. The fiction tracks both the struggle over clandestine businesses in the city and the relationship between Andrea Abascal (Michelle Jenner) and Ricardo León (Álex García).

Cast

Production and release 
Created, written and directed by Frank Ariza, El Continental was produced by RTVE in collaboration with Gossip Events. Consisting of 10 episodes with a running time of around 70 minutes, the series was shot in a film set in San Sebastián de los Reyes and in the Príncipe Pío train station in Madrid.

Derided in social media already since the release of the first images as a knock-off of Peaky Blinders, the series also received harsh reviews by professional critics after its pre-screening at the FesTVal in Vitoria. It premiered on La 1 on 17 September 2018 with a "correct" 10.4% audience share in prime time, only to sink down to a 2.8% audience share in the season finale aired on 20 November 2018, when the series had been already moved to the late night slot. At the time of its closure, the series was described as "the biggest fiasco of national (Spanish) fiction in recent times".

References 

2018 Spanish television series debuts
2018 Spanish television series endings
2010s Spanish drama television series
Television series set in the 1920s
Television shows set in Madrid
Television shows filmed in Spain
La 1 (Spanish TV channel) network series
Television series about organized crime
Spanish crime television series